This is a list of Navy Cross recipients for actions of valor carried out during the Vietnam War, awarded by the United States Department of the Navy.

The Vietnam War was a conflict in Vietnam, Laos, and Cambodia from 1 November 1955 to the fall of Saigon on 30 April 1975. It was officially fought between North Vietnam, supported by the Soviet Union, China, and other communist allies, and South Vietnam, supported by the United States and other anti-communist allies. After the French military withdrawal from Indochina in 1954, the U.S. assumed financial and military support for the South Vietnamese state. U.S. involvement escalated under President John F. Kennedy, from just under a thousand military advisors in 1959 to 23,000 in 1964. After the Gulf of Tonkin incident in August 1964, the U.S. Congress passed the Gulf of Tonkin Resolution and gave President Lyndon B. Johnson broad authority to increase the U.S. military presence in Vietnam. Johnson ordered the deployment of combat units for the first time and increased troop levels, reaching a peak of 543,000 in April 1969. The Paris Peace Accords of January 1973 saw all U.S. forces withdrawn.

, this list is incomplete, showing 496 Navy Crosses awarded in all service branches for actions of valor during the Vietnam War: 124 to US Navy recipients; 369 to US Marine Corps recipients; one Republic of Vietnam Navy recipient; one Army of the Republic of Vietnam recipient; and one US Army recipient. By partial comparison, the U.S. Department of Defense shows 126 awarded to Navy recipients and 370 to Marines Corps recipients, for acts of valor during the Vietnam War.

A

B

C

D

E–F

G

H

I–K

L

M

N–Q

R

S

T–V

W–Z

See also
List of Medal of Honor recipients for the Vietnam War
List of Navy Cross recipients for World War II
List of Navy Cross recipients for the Korean War

Notes

References

External links
 
 Top 3 are: Medal of Honor; Distinguished Service Cross / Navy Cross / Air Force Cross; Silver Star
 this US DOD source only reports US Navy and US Marine Corps recipients of the Navy Cross
 
 this long standing private source believes it is "99.9% complete" for all military, civilian and allied recipients of the Top 2 (above Silver Star)

Navy Cross recipients